The Blue Riband was a greyhound racing competition held annually at Wembley Stadium and Hall Green Stadium. It was inaugurated in 1981 as a replacement competition for the Wembley Spring Cup which finished in 1980.

Following the end of the Wembley Greyhounds the race transferred to Greyhound Racing Association (GRA) sister track Hall Green in 1999. The race was discontinued by the GRA after the 2012 running despite being a category one race.

Past winners

Discontinued

Venues & Distances 
1981-1998 (Wembley 490m)
1999-2012 (Hall Green 480m)

Sponsors
1994-1998 Wendy Fair Markets
2005-2009 William Hill
2010-2010 Stan James bookmakers
2011-2011 Betfair
2012-2012 Ladbrokes

References

Greyhound racing competitions in the United Kingdom
Recurring sporting events established in 1981
Events at Wembley Stadium
Sport in the London Borough of Brent
Greyhound racing in London
Sports competitions in Birmingham, West Midlands